Roche Lake Provincial Park is a provincial park in British Columbia, Canada, located northeast of Stump Lake in the Nicola Country of that province's South-Central Interior.  The park lies to the northwest of the city of Merritt and to the south of Kamloops.

References

Provincial parks of British Columbia
Nicola Country
1996 establishments in British Columbia
Protected areas established in 1996